Rear Admiral Sir John Chicheley ( – 20 March 1691) was a Royal Navy officer. He commanded a squadron at the Battle of Schooneveld in June 1673 and the Battle of Texel in August 1673 during the Franco-Dutch War. He went on to be Commissioner of the Ordnance and then Senior Naval Lord. He was also a Member of Parliament.

Naval career
Born the second son of Thomas Chicheley of Wimpole, Chicheley entered the Inner Temple to study the law in 1657. Promoted to lieutenant in 1662 and to post-captain in 1663, he took command of the sixth-rate HMS Milford in August 1664, of the fourth-rate HMS Bristol in September 1664 and of the fourth-rate HMS Phoenix in December 1664. He went on to command the fourth-rate HMS Antelope in October 1665, the third-rate HMS Fairfax in July 1666 and the third-rate HMS Rupert in August 1668. He served as an envoy to the Spanish Netherlands in 1670 and then took command of the third-rate HMS Dreadnought in 1671.

Promoted to rear admiral in 1672, Chicheley commanded a squadron at the Battle of Schooneveld in June 1673 and the Battle of Texel in August 1673 during the Franco-Dutch War. He was elected to the Parliament of England as MP for Newton, Lancashire from 1679 to 1681, 1685 to 1687 and 1689 to 1691.

Chicheley joined the Board of Admiralty under Prince Rupert in September 1677 but stood down to become Commissioner of the Ordnance in May 1679. He resigned as Commissioner of the Ordnance in January 1682 and returned to the Admiralty Board. After advancement to Senior Naval Lord in January 1690, he retired from the Board in June 1690. Chicheley died suddenly on 20 March 1691 and was buried at St Giles in the Fields in London.

Family

Chicheley married Isabella, the daughter and coheiress of Sir John Lawson of Alresford, Essex, and the widow of Daniel Norton of Southwick, Hampshire. They had four sons (two of whom predeceased him) and two daughters.

References

Sources

|-

Members of the Inner Temple
Royal Navy officers
English MPs 1679
English MPs 1680–1681
English MPs 1685–1687
English MPs 1689–1690
English MPs 1690–1695
1640 births
1691 deaths
People from Wimpole
Lords of the Admiralty